The National Liberation Party of Unity (also known as PAPERNAS) is an Indonesian left-leaning party founded in 2006 by the merger of several smaller parties. It holds a social-democratic ideology.

External links
  Official Site

2006 establishments in Indonesia
Political parties established in 2006
Political parties in Indonesia
Socialist parties in Indonesia